William Jennings may refer to:

William Jennings (mayor) (1823–1886), mayor of Salt Lake City, Utah, USA
William M. Jennings (1920–1981), one time owner of the New York Rangers of the National Hockey League; the League annually gives out an award in his honour
William Nicholson Jennings (1860–1946), photographer in Philadelphia
W. Pat Jennings (1919–1994), Representative in the United States Congress from Virginia
William Sherman Jennings (1863–1920), governor of Florida, United States
William Thomas Jennings (1854–1923), New Zealand politician
 William Jennings (priest) (died 1565), Dean of Gloucester, 1541–1565
William Dale Jennings (1917–2000), American author of The Cowboys, The Ronin, and The Sinking of the Sarah Diamond
Sir William Ivor Jennings (1903–1965), British lawyer and academic
William Jennens (1701–1798), "William the Miser", "William the Rich", 'the richest commoner in England' who died intestate

See also 
William Jennings Bryan (1860–1925), orator and three times the Democratic Party's candidate for the US presidency
Bill Jennings (disambiguation)